Pendelton is the surname of the following people

Andrew Pendelton III, stage name of the American professional wrestler Andrew Robert Horsefield (born 1982)
Thomas Pendelton (born 1971), American tattoo artist and television personality

See also
Pendleton (name)

English-language surnames